Sir Jack Kent Hunn  (24 August 1906 – 14 June 1997) was a New Zealand civil servant. Hunn served as Secretary of Defence, Secretary of Maori Affairs, Secretary of Justice, and Chairman of the Fire Service Commission.

Early life
Hunn was born in Masterton, and attended Wairarapa High School, before joining the Public Trust Office as a cadet. He attended Victoria University of Wellington, where he gained an LLM. Hunn joined the PSA in 1940, and worked on the executive, and became New Zealand Public Service Association President in 1945. In 1946, Hunn stepped down to become an Inspector of the Public Service Commission, working within Government to resolve public sector industrial issues. He became a commissioner in 1954, and expanded his knowledge across a broad range of the public service. While a commissioner, Hunn acted as secretary of Internal Affairs, Secretary of Justice, and Secretary of Maori Affairs.

Hunn Report
In 1960, Prime Minister Walter Nash engaged Hunn to do a review of the Maori Affairs Department. Hunn included in his review a wide-ranging summary of Maori assets, and the state of Maori in New Zealand at the time. Maori were going through a process of urbanisation, and Hunn's report raised the issue of integration of Maori within broader New Zealand, as opposed to segregation or assimilation. The Hunn report served as the blueprint for the establishment of the Maori Education Foundation, and the New Zealand Maori Council, and became the basis for Maori policy throughout the 1960s.

Secretary of Defence
Hunn was appointed to the new role of Secretary of Defence in 1963. This involved the establishment of a civilian department to be charged with defence policy, separate from the military Chiefs of Defence Staff. He advocated a full integration of the New Zealand Defence services, but was opposed by the individual military forces.

During 1964 Hunn was a strong opponent of New Zealand involvement in Vietnam. Initially, New Zealand Ambassador to Washington George Laking was a strong advocate for intervention, with internal opposition from Secretary of Foreign Affairs Alister McIntosh. Hunn was the clearest opponent: while Defence Chiefs were in favour of New Zealand involvement, Hunn argued that New Zealand's interests remained with supporting Malaysia, but that South Vietnam was not a sovereign state, and did not need military support. When New Zealand sent combat forces to Vietnam in 1965, Hunn retired early from Defence.

Retirement
Hunn served as Chairman of the Fire Service Commission from 1973-1977, and under the mandate of Internal Affairs Minister Allan Highet, he established a national professional fire service from a large number of small, provincial brigades. He also wrote his memoir, Not Only Affairs of State.

Personal life
Hunn's two sons have been prominent in public life: his elder son, Don Hunn, was a senior diplomat and served as State Services Commissioner, and his younger son, John, was Chief Executive and Chairman of the Todd Corporation.

Honours
Hunn was appointed a Companion of the Order of St Michael and St George in the 1964 Queen's Birthday Honours. In the 1976 New Year Honours, he was made a Knight Bachelor for public services, especially as chair of the Fire Services Commission. In 1977, he was awarded the Queen Elizabeth II Silver Jubilee Medal.

Further reading

References

1906 births
1997 deaths
New Zealand Companions of the Order of St Michael and St George
New Zealand trade unionists
New Zealand public servants
Victoria University of Wellington alumni
New Zealand Knights Bachelor